To Kill a Child may refer to:

 "To Kill a Child" (short story), 1948 short story by Stig Dagerman
 To Kill a Child (1953 film), Swedish short film based on the short story
 To Kill a Child (2003 film), Swedish-Finnish short film based on the short story